Ural Typhoon is Russia's multi-functional, modular, armoured, mine resistant vehicle family. The chassis consists of the car bonnet, frame, three-axle drive, bonneted frame and chassis. The Typhoon is part of Russia's large vehicle Typhoon program.

Versions
Can be used as reconnaissance, command and staff vehicles, machinery EW / RTR or communications, ambulance or to conduct engineering, radiation, chemical and biological reconnaissance of transportation.

Operational History

A Ukrainian military intelligence report has the truck to offer “weak protection against damage by small arms”

Features
Two variants have been identified thus far:

Ural-63095

 Total weight: 24 tons
 Crew: 3 + 16 in module
 Configuration: 6 × 6
 Power: YaMZ-5367 450 hp turbodiesel
 Transmission: six-speed automatic transmission,
 Transfer Case: mechanical two-stage,
 Tyres: bullet-proof with automatic sealing
 Armor type: Laminated glass and composite (steel and ceramic)
 Protection class: proof from 14.5 mm armor-piercing bullets, up to 8 kg of explosives underneath
 Armament: remote-controlled unit mounting a 7.62 mm HMG or 14.5 mm KPV HMG, loopholes

Ural-63099
 Crew: 3 + 12

Operators

Current operators
 

  -  1+  had been captured from the Russian Armed Forces during the 2022 Russian invasion of Ukraine.

See also
Kamaz Typhoon
ZIL Karatel

Notes

External links 

Wheeled armoured fighting vehicles
Wheeled armoured personnel carriers
Military trucks
Ural factory
Armoured fighting vehicles of Russia
Military Industrial Company military vehicles
Military vehicles introduced in the 2010s